Pallabi is a thana of Dhaka District in the Division of Dhaka, Bangladesh.
It is bounded by turag and uttara thanas on the north, mirpur model and shah ali thanas on the south, bimanbandar, cantonment and kafrul thanas on the east, savar upazila on the west.

Geography 
Its total area is 17 km².

Demographics 
Pallabi has a population of 364,000. Males constitute 52.74% of the population and females 47.26%. Pallabi has an average literacy rate of 56.23%, compared to the national average of 32.4%.

Administration 
Pallabi has one union/ward, 16+27 mauzas/mahallas, and no villages.

See also 
 Upazilas of Bangladesh
 Districts of Bangladesh
 Divisions of Bangladesh
 List of districts and suburbs of Dhaka

References 

Thanas of Dhaka